Momir Karadžić (born 16 July 1952 in the Socialist Federal Republic of Yugoslavia) is a former professional Serbian footballer.

Karadžić made 53 appearances in the 2. Fußball-Bundesliga for Tennis Borussia Berlin during his playing career, scoring four goals.

References

External links 
 

1952 births
Living people
Yugoslav footballers
Serbian footballers
Association football midfielders
FK Rad players
OFK Titograd players
KF Liria players
FK Trepča players
SC Heerenveen players
Eerste Divisie players
2. Bundesliga players
Tennis Borussia Berlin players
Yugoslav expatriate footballers
Expatriate footballers in West Germany
Yugoslav expatriate sportspeople in Germany